"Home on Lagrange (The L5 Song)" is a filk song, written in 1977 by William S. Higgins and Barry D. Gehm, intended to be sung to the tune of Home on the Range. The song's lyrics satirize the enthusiasm of space-colony advocates.

A U.S. copyright has been registered on "Home on Lagrange (The L5 Song)."  
Higgins and Gehm originally published it in the magazine CoEvolution Quarterly in 1978. It was subsequently republished in many other media, including the NESFA Hymnal and the L5 Society magazine L5 News.
It was anthologized in The Endless Frontier, a collection of stories about space colonization. The song was also quoted by historian W. Patrick McCray in his book The Visioneers. Today, it can be found at various websites on the Internet, often without attribution.

The chorus of "Home On Lagrange:"

 Home, home on Lagrange,
 Where the space debris always collects,
 We possess, so it seems, two of Man's greatest dreams:
 Solar power and zero-gee sex.

References

External links
 James Oberg's website has permission to host the song.
 The L4 and L5 Lagrangian Points explained by David P. Stern

1978 songs
Space colonization
Filk songs